The 2016–17 Eastern Illinois Panthers men's basketball team represented Eastern Illinois University during the 2016–17 NCAA Division I men's basketball season. The Panthers, led by fifth-year head coach Jay Spoonhour, played their home games at Lantz Arena and were members of the West Division of the Ohio Valley Conference. They finished the season 14–15, 6–10 in OVC play to finish in fifth place in the West Division. They failed to qualify for the Ohio Valley Conference tournament.

Previous season 
The Panthers finished the 2015–16 season 13–17, 9–7 in OVC play to finish in third place in the West Division. They lost in the first round of the OVC tournament to Murray State.

Preseason 
In a vote of Ohio Valley Conference head men’s basketball coaches and sports information directors, Eastern Illinois was picked to finish second in the West Division of the OVC. Cornell Johnston was selected to the All-OVC Preseason Team.

Roster

Schedule and results

|-
!colspan=9 style=| Exhibition

|-
!colspan=9 style=| Non-conference regular season

|-
!colspan=9 style=| Ohio Valley Conference regular season

References

Eastern Illinois Panthers men's basketball seasons
Eastern Illinois